The Communist Party of Kirghizia was the ruling political party and the section of the Communist Party of the Soviet Union in the Kirghiz Soviet Socialist Republic (present-day Kyrgyzstan).

Regional committees 

 Frunze City Committee
 Jalal-Abad Regional Committee of the Communist Party of Kyrgyzstan
 Issyk-Kul Regional Committee of the Communist Party of Kyrgyzstan
 Naryn Regional Committee of the Communist Party of Kyrgyzstan
 Osh Regional Committee of the Communist Party of Kyrgyzstan
 Talas Regional Committee of the Communist Party of Kyrgyzstan
 Frunze Regional Committee of the Communist Party of Kyrgyzstan

First Secretaries of the Communist Party of Kirghizia 

Nikolay Uzukov (1925–1927)
Vladimir Shubrikov (1927–1929)
Mikhail Kulkov (1929–1930)
Alexander Shakhray (1930–1934)
Moris Belotsky (1934–1937)
Maksim Ammosov (1937)
Aleksey Vagov (1938–1945)
Nikolay Bogolyubov (1945–1950)
Iskhak Razzakov (1950–1961)
Turdakun Usubaliyev (1961–1985)
Absamat Masaliyev (1985–1991)
Jumgalbek Amanbayev (1991)

See also
Leadership of Communist Kyrgyzstan
Party of Communists of Kyrgyzstan (the 1999 split Communist Party of Kyrgyzstan)
Kakish Ryskulova

References 

Communist parties in the Soviet Union
Kirghizia
Communist parties in Kyrgyzstan
Political parties established in 1924
Parties of one-party systems
Political parties disestablished in 1991
Defunct political parties in Kyrgyzstan
Kirghiz Soviet Socialist Republic
1924 establishments in the Soviet Union
1991 disestablishments in the Soviet Union